The 1988 Dubai Duty Free Masters was a non-ranking snooker tournament which took place in September 1988 in Dubai, United Arab Emirates.

The tournament featured eight professional players drawn against eight local players. Each of the professionals won 2–0 in their best-of-3-frame matches.

Neal Foulds won beating Steve Davis 5–4 in the final.

Main draw

References

Dubai Classic
Dubai Masters
Dubai Masters
Dubai Masters